Microanalysis is the chemical identification and quantitative analysis of very small amounts  of chemical substances (generally less than 10 mg or 1 ml) or very small surfaces  of material (generally less than 1 cm2). One of the pioneers in the microanalysis of chemical elements was the Austrian Nobel Prize winner Fritz Pregl.

Methods 
The most known methods used in microanalysis include:
 Most of the spectroscopy methods: ultraviolet–visible spectroscopy, infrared spectroscopy, nuclear magnetic resonance, X-ray fluorescence, Energy-dispersive X-ray spectroscopy, Wavelength-dispersive X-ray spectroscopy, and mass spectrometry
 Most of the chromatography methods : high-performance liquid chromatography, Gel permeation chromatography;
 Some thermal analysis methods: differential scanning calorimetry, thermogravimetric analysis; 
 Electrophoresis;
 Field flow fractionation;
 X-ray diffraction;
 Combustion analysis.

Advantages 
Compared to normal analyses methods, microanalysis:
 Can resolve fine-scale variations in chemical elements.
 Can be used to identify the presence and distribution of different phases in materials.
 Requires less sample material and therefore can provide information on microscopic objects.

Disadvantages 
 Handling of small quantities is not always simple.
 Higher accuracy of weighing is necessary (e.g. use of accurate balance).
 Sample surface preparation can have a major impact on measurement results.

References 

Analytical chemistry